Penetes is a monotypic butterfly genus in the family Nymphalidae. Its single species Penetes pamphanis is a large butterfly native to south-eastern Brazil.

References

Morphinae
Fauna of Brazil
Nymphalidae of South America
Monotypic butterfly genera
Taxa named by Edward Doubleday
Nymphalidae genera